Anka Grupińska (born 1956) is a Polish dissident, journalist and writer. She co-founded the periodical Czas Kultury.

Life
Grpinska was born in 1956. She attended the Adam Mickiewicz University in Poznań where she studied English literature. She was involved in dissident writing and she co-founded the underground periodical Czas Kultury.

Since 2006 she has been recording the history of the Jews in Poland. She conducts interviews that are recorded for a museum.

Following Poland's independence she was awarded the Order of Polish Rebirth by the president.

References

21st-century Polish women writers
Polish journalists
Polish women journalists
Polish dissidents
Recipients of the Order of Polonia Restituta
1956 births
Living people
Adam Mickiewicz University in Poznań alumni
20th-century Polish women